Fabrateria can refer to two ancient cities in Italy: 

Fabrateria Nova ("New Fabrateria"), today San Giovanni Incarico
Fabrateria Vetus ("Old Fabrateria"), today Ceccano